MAD Architects (sometimes referred to as MAD or MAD Studio) is an architectural design firm based in Beijing, China, with offices in Los Angeles, New York City, and Rome. MAD Architects is currently led by Ma Yansong, Dang Qun and Yosuke Hayano.

Cultural projects 
 Lucas Museum of Narrative Art, On-going - Los Angeles, California, USA
 Pingtan Art Museum - Pingtan, China
 Harbin Grand Theatre, 2015 – Harbin, China
 China Wood Sculpture Museum, 2012 – Harbin, China
 Ordos Museum, 2011 – Ordos, China
 National Art Museum of China - Beijing, China
 Hutong Bubble, 2009 – Beijing, China
 Wormhole library, 2021 – Hainan, China

Residential/Hospitality projects 
 Gardenhouse, 2020 - Beverly Hills, California, USA
 Huangshan Mountain Village, 2017 - Huangshan, China
 71 Via Boncompagni, 2019 - Rome, Italy
 Sanya Phoenix Island, 2018 - Sanya, China
 UNIC (Parc Clichy-Batignolles), 2019 – Paris, France
 Baiziwan Social Housing, 2017 - Beijing, China
 Conrad Hotel, 2013 – Beijing, China
 Absolute Towers, 2012 – Mississauga, Canada
 Sheraton Huzhou Hot Spring Resort, 2012 – Huzhou, China
 Fake Hills, 2015 – Beihei, China
 Soho Shanghai - Shanghai, China
 Urban Forest, 2009 – Chongqing, China
 Taichung Convention Center - Tai Chung, Taiwan
 Hongluo Clubhouse – Beijing, China

Commercial/Office projects 
 Xinhee Research & Design Center, 2018 – Xiamen, China
 Chaoyang Park Plaza, 2017 – Beijing, China
 Nanjing Zendai Himalayas Center, Under construction – Nanjing, China
 Sino-Steel International Plaza & MGM Mirage, 2018 - Tianjin, China

Educational projects 
 Clover House, 2016 - Aichi, Japan

Exhibitions 

 2016 "Invisible Border", Milan Design Week, Milan, Italy
 2015 "MADe in China", Danish Architecture Center, Solo Exhibition, Copenhagen, Denmark
 2015 "Architectures for Dogs", Shanghai Himalayas Museum, Shanghai, China
 2015 Shenzhen & Hong Kong Bi-City Biennale of Urbanism Architecture, Shenzhen, China
 2014 Shanshui City Exhibition, Solo Exhibition, Beijing, China 
 2014 “The Changing Skyline” - Beijing Design Week, Beijing, China 
 2014 “Future Cities -- High Mountain, Flowing Water” China Shan-Shui City Design Exhibition Berlin, Germany
 2014 “Silhouette Shanshui”, “Across Chinese Cities - Beijing”, 14th Venice Architecture Exhibition Venice, Italy
 2013 Shanshui City Exhibition, Solo Exhibition Beijing, China 
 2012 Between the Modernity and Tradition, Solo Exhibition, ICO Museum Madrid, Spain
 2011 Verso Est: Chinese Architectural Landscape, MAXXI, Rome, Italy Rome, Italy
 2010 "Feelings Are Facts", Ullens Center for Contemporary Art (UCCA), Exhibition with Olafur Eliasson, Beijing, China

Art/Installation projects 
 Super Star: A Mobile China Town, 2006-2018 - 11th Venice Architecture Biennale
 Rebuilt WTC - New York, USA
 Ink Ice, 2006 - Beijing, China
 Fish Tank, 2004

References

External links 
 

Architecture firms of China
Companies established in 2004
Privately held companies of China